The term Supertramp was coined by the Welsh writer W. H. Davies in his autobiography The Autobiography of a Super-Tramp. 

Supertramp also may refer to:
 Supertramp, British progressive rock band
 Supertramp (album) by the aforementioned band
 Alexander Supertramp, alias of Christopher McCandless, American hiker portrayed in the book and film "Into the Wild"
 Devinsupertramp, alias of Devin Graham, maker of adventure and extreme sport videos
 Supertramp (ecology), various species that easily and continually migrate